Malik Couturier (born 21 January 1982, in Jonzac) is a French football defender.

Couturier previously played for Niort and Angers in Ligue 2.

Honours
Chamois Niortais

 Championnat National champions: 2005–06

References

External links

1982 births
Living people
French footballers
Chamois Niortais F.C. players
Angers SCO players
Stade Lavallois players
Ligue 2 players
Association football defenders